Bruce Victor Beaver  (14 February 1928 – 17 February 2004) was an Australian poet and novelist.

Biography
Beaver was  born in Manly, New South Wales. He was educated at the Manly Public School and at the Sydney Boys' High School. He worked at a number of jobs, as a cow farmer, in radio, as a wages clerk, a surveyor's labourer, fruit-picker, proof-reader and journalist, before deciding to write full-time. From 1958 to 1962, he lived in New Zealand and Norfolk Island.

In 1961 Beaver's first book of poetry was published.  He wrote his first poem in response to the dropping of the atomic bomb at Hiroshima, and continued to write even while working as a labourer. Thanks to his marriage, he was able to become a full-time writer. Even though he suffered from bipolar disorder, Beaver was able to continue writing until close to his death in 2004.

When asked to list their favourite books, Dorothy Porter named Bruce Beaver and is quoted as saying:

Awards
 1970: Grace Leven Prize for Poetry (for Letters to Live Poets)
 1982: Patrick White Award
 1990: New South Wales Premier's Literary Awards (Special Award)
1991: Member of the Order of Australia
 1995: C. J. Dennis Prize for Poetry (for Anima and Other Poems)

Bibliography

Poetry
 Under the Bridge (1961) Sydney: Beaujon Press.
 Seawall and Shoreline (1964) Sydney: South Head Press.
 Open at Random (1967) Sydney: South Head Press.
 Letters to Live Poets (1969) Sydney: South Head Press. 
 Lauds and plaints : poems (1968-1972) (1974) Sydney: South Head Press.
 Odes and Days (1975) Sydney: South Head Press.   
 Death's Directives (1978) Sydney. New Poetry/Prism Books.   
 Headlands: Prose sketches (1986) St. Lucia: University of Queensland Press.
 Charmed lives (1988) St. Lucia: University of Queensland Press.   
 New and Selected Poems 1960-1990 (1991) St. Lucia: University of Queensland Press. 
 Anima and Other Poems (1994) St. Lucia: University of Queensland Press. 
 Poets and others (1999) Sydney: Brandl & Schlesinger.
 The Long Game and Other Poems (2005) St. Lucia: University of Queensland Press.  review

Autobiography
As it was ...  (1979) St. Lucia: University of Queensland Press.

Novels
 The Hot Summer (1963) Sydney: Horwitz.
 Hot Sands (1964) Sydney: Horwitz.
 The Hot Men (1965) Sydney: Horwitz.
 The Hot Spring (1965) Sydney: Horwitz.
 You Can't Come Back (1966) Adelaide: Rigby.

Notes

External links
Interview
Obituary Obituary
The Politics of Influence: Bruce Beaver's Letters to Live Poets by Robert Savage
    Obituary, The Age

1928 births
2004 deaths
Australian male novelists
Writers from Sydney
People with bipolar disorder
People educated at Sydney Boys High School
Patrick White Award winners
People from Manly, New South Wales
20th-century Australian poets
Australian male poets
Australian Book Review people
20th-century Australian male writers
Members of the Order of Australia